Antonín Fivébr (22 November 1888 – 26 February 1973) was a Czech footballer and manager of clubs such as Valencia, Spartak Moscow, and Brescia.

Career
In 1908, Fivébr joined Sparta Prague to play as a midfielder. Twelve years later in 1920, Fivébr left Sparta to join Brescia in Italy. At Brescia he became a player-manager.

Fivébr went to Spain in 1923 to become the manager of Valencia. He spent seven years as the Valencia coach in three different stints. At Valencia he won three regional championships and won promotion to La Liga in 1931. Other Spanish clubs Fivébr managed were Elche, Real Oviedo, Levante, and Real Murcia.

Fivébr moved to the Soviet Union in 1935. Shortly afterwards in 1936, Fivébr was named the first ever manager of the newly born Spartak Moscow. However, he only lasted two months on the job and was looking for work elsewhere. Fivébr would go on to manage Dynamo Leningrad, Stalinets Moscow, and clubs in Dnipropetrovsk and Zaporizhia.

In 1938, Fivébr returned to his native Czechoslovakia, where he managed Viktoria Žižkov, Jednota Košice, and finally Spartak Trnava.

Death
Fivébr died in his home city of Prague on 26 February 1973.

References

1888 births
1973 deaths
Footballers from Prague
Czech footballers
Czechoslovak footballers
Association football midfielders
AC Sparta Prague players
Brescia Calcio players
Brescia Calcio managers
Valencia CF managers
Real Oviedo managers
Levante UD managers
Real Murcia managers
FC Spartak Moscow managers
FC Dynamo Saint Petersburg managers
FC VSS Košice managers
Czech football managers
Czechoslovak football managers
Expatriate football managers in Italy
Expatriate football managers in the Soviet Union
Expatriate football managers in Spain
Czechoslovak expatriate footballers
Expatriate footballers in Italy
Czechoslovak expatriate sportspeople in Italy
Czechoslovak expatriate sportspeople in Spain
Czechoslovak expatriate sportspeople in the Soviet Union
People from the Kingdom of Bohemia